Rubus glabratus is a Latin American species of brambles in the rose family. It is native to Central America (Panamá, Costa Rica) and South America (Colombia, Ecuador, Bolivia).

Rubus glabratus is a perennial subshrub with stems up to 80 cm (2 2/3 feet) long, with curved prickles. Flowers are rose-colored. Fruit is red.

The genetics of Rubus is extremely complex, so that it is difficult to decide on which groups should be recognized as species. There are many rare species with limited ranges such as this. Further study is suggested to clarify the taxonomy.

References

glabratus
Plants described in 1824
Flora of Central America
Flora of South America